Vaccinium myrtilloides is a shrub with common names including common blueberry, velvetleaf huckleberry, velvetleaf blueberry, Canadian blueberry, and sourtop blueberry. It is common in much of North America, reported from all 10 Canadian provinces plus Nunavut and Northwest Territories, as well as from the northeastern and Great Lakes states in the United States. It is also known to occur in Montana and Washington.

Description
Vaccinium myrtilloides is a low spreading deciduous shrub growing up to 50 cm (20 inches) tall, often spreading to form small thickets. The leaves are bright green, paler underneath with velvety hairs. The flowers are white, bell-shaped, 5 mm (0.2 inches) long. The fruit is a small sweet bright blue to dark blue berry. Young stems have stiff dense bristly hairs.

Vaccinium myrtilloides grows best in open coniferous woods with dry loose acidic soils; it is also found in forested bogs and rocky areas. It is fire-tolerant and is often abundant following forest fires or clear-cut logging. Vaccinium myrtilloides hybridizes in the wild with Vaccinium angustifolium (lowbush blueberry).

Characteristics
Vaccinium myrtilloides is also cultivated and grown commercially in Canada and Maine, mainly harvested from managed wild patches. Vaccinium myrtilloides is one of the sweetest blueberries known.

It is also an important food source for black bears, deer, small mammals, and birds.

Conservation Status in the United States
This species is listed as endangered in Indiana and Connecticut, as threatened in Iowa and Ohio, and as sensitive in Washington (state).

Native American Ethnobotany

As cuisine
The Abenaki consume the fruit as part of their traditional diet. The Nihithawak Cree eat the berries raw, make them into jam and eat it with fish and bannock, and boil or pound the sun-dried berries into pemmican. The Hesquiaht First Nation make pies and preserves from the berries. The Hoh and Quileute consume the fruit raw, stew the berries and make them into a sauce, and can the berries and use them as a winter food. The Ojibwa make use of the berries, gathering and selling them, eating them fresh, sun drying and canning them for future use. The Nlaka'pamux make the berries into pies. The Algonquin people gather the fruit to eat and sell. The berries are part of Potawatomi traditional cuisine, and are eaten fresh, dried, and canned.

As medicine
The Nihithawak Cree use a decoction of leafy stems used to bring menstruation and prevent pregnancy, to make a person sweat, to slow excessive menstrual bleeding, to bring blood after childbirth, and to prevent miscarriage. The Potawatomi also use the root bark of the plant for an unspecified ailment.

Other uses
The Nihithawak Cree use the berries to dye porcupine quills.

See also
Vaccinium
Huckleberry

References

myrtilloides
Plants described in 1803
Blueberries
Flora of Western Canada
Plants used in Native American cuisine
Plants used in traditional Native American medicine
Flora of Eastern Canada
Flora of Subarctic America
Flora of the Northeastern United States
Flora of the North-Central United States
Flora of Montana